The border between Croatia and Serbia in the area of the Danube is disputed. While Serbia holds the opinion that the thalweg of the Danube valley and the centerline of the river represents the international border between the two countries, Croatia disagrees and claims that the international border lies along the boundaries of the cadastral municipalities located along the river—departing from the course at several points along a  section. The cadastre-based boundary reflects the course of the Danube which existed in the 19th century, before meandering and hydrotechnical engineering works altered its course.

The dispute first arose in 1947, but was left unresolved during the existence of the Socialist Federal Republic of Yugoslavia. It became a contentious issue after the breakup of Yugoslavia. Particular prominence was given to the dispute at the time of Croatia's accession to the European Union.  the dispute remains unresolved, and the line of control mostly corresponds to Serbia's claim.

Territorial claims

20th century

The Croatia–Serbia border dispute entails competing claims regarding the border at several points along the Danube River valley shared by the two countries. In that area, the border is defined differently by the neighbouring countries—either as following the course of the Danube, as claimed by Serbia, or following a line tracing the borders of cadastral municipalities having seat in either of the two countries, as claimed by Croatia. The cadastre-based boundary also traces the former riverbed of the Danube, which was changed by meandering and hydraulic engineering works in the 19th century, after the cadastre was established.

The bulk of the territory in dispute is in the vicinity of the town of Apatin, while the Island of Šarengrad and the Island of Vukovar are cited as particularly contentious parts of the dispute. Further disputed areas are located near the town of Bačka Palanka, and in the municipality of Sombor, at the tripoint of Croatia, Hungary and Serbia. Croatia claims that the cadastre-based boundary was adopted by the Đilas Commission, set up in 1945 to determine the borders between federal constituents of Yugoslavia, while Serbia claims that the same commission identified the boundary as the course of the Danube in 1945. In 1991, the Arbitration Commission of the Peace Conference on Yugoslavia ruled that the border between federal units of Yugoslavia became inviolable international borders, without referring to locations of any specific claim or line. Prior to the ruling, Serbia asserted that the borders were subject to change following the breakup of Yugoslavia and the independence of Croatia. Since the Croatian War of Independence, the line of control coincides with the Serbian claim.

21st century
On 28 July 2002, warning shots were fired by a patrol boat of the Yugoslav Army at four boats carrying the prefect of Vukovar-Srijem County and the mayors of Vukovar and Bačka Palanka, as well as several other civilians to Bačka Palanka. Shots were also fired at a Croatian patrol boat after it attempted to approach the vessel carrying the prefect and the mayor. There were no casualties, but the passengers and crew of the civilian boat were arrested. Four elderly individuals and four children were released immediately, while the rest were interviewed at a Yugoslav military barracks for two hours before being set free. Yugoslav foreign minister Goran Svilanović expressed regret over the incident, but Croatian Prime Minister Ivica Račan stated that Croatia was not satisfied with the gesture. The Serbian Army withdrew from the border in October 2006, turning control over to the Serbian police.

In early 2000, Croatia and Serbia set up a commission tasked with determining the border, but in its first ten years it convened only once or twice. Since 2010, the issue has gained increasing prominence in the disputing countries. Plans for construction of a port in Apatin, on a piece of territory claimed by Croatia, added fuel to the dispute. After years of inactivity the inter-governmental commission established to identify and determine the border between Croatia and Serbia met in Zagreb in April 2010, only to conclude that there was a difference of opinions on the matter. Later that month, the Serbian Radical Party (SRS) deputies in the National Assembly proposed a resolution which would require that Serbian officials resolve the dispute in compliance with the Serbian claim. Months later, Radoslav Stojanović, a former legal representative of Serbia and Montenegro in the Bosnian Genocide Case and former ambassador to the Netherlands, likened the dispute to the Croatia–Slovenia border dispute in the Gulf of Piran. Stojanović said that the position held by Croatia in its dispute with Slovenia was favourable for Serbia and warned that Serbia might be in a disadvantageous position if Croatia joined the European Union (EU) before Serbia—which would allow it to impose its conditions to the process of accession of Serbia to the EU.

By 2011, Serbian diplomats made several requests to the EU, asking it to pressure Croatia to resolve the dispute before Croatia's accession to the union out of fear that it might follow the Slovene example and stall Serbian accession similar to the impasse between Croatia and Slovenia over their border disputes and the subsequent blockade of the Croatian EU accession negotiation process. The request was denied by the EU. Croatian President Ivo Josipović said that the dispute was the most contentious issue of Croatia–Serbia relations but added that it should not be difficult to resolve. In 2012, Josipović stated that Croatia should not block Serbia's EU accession over the issue and suggested that the dispute should be resolved through arbitration, which is considered to be an acceptable solution by both countries. In 2014, the Croatian ambassador to Serbia reiterated Josipović's stance from 2012. On the other hand, Zoran Milanović, the Prime Minister of Croatia, said that the resolution of the border dispute would be Croatia's condition placed before Serbia in its EU accession negotiations.

Vukovar Island Agreement
In 2006, representatives of the city of Vukovar and the municipality of Bač, located on the bank opposite Vukovar, reached an agreement on use of Vukovar Island as a recreational facility and beach.  The island is accessible to organised transport by boats sailing from Vukovar.  No border controls are involved in the process.  By 2012, visits to the island reached 150,000 persons per year.

Liberland and other claims

On 13 April 2015, Vít Jedlička from the Czech Party of Free Citizens proclaimed the micronation Liberland on what he said is land left unclaimed by both Croatia and Serbia. The other pockets west of the Danube were similarly claimed as micronations named Verdis, Enclava and Ongal. The Croatian Ministry of Foreign and European Affairs has rejected these claims, stating that the differing border claims between Serbia and Croatia do not involve terra nullius, and are not subject to occupation by a third party. However, the Serbian Ministry of Foreign Affairs stated on 24 April 2015 that while Serbia does not consider "Liberland" to be an important matter, the "new state" does not impinge upon the Serbian border, which is delineated by the Danube River.

Evolution of the border

Until 1922
The evolution of the Croatia–Serbia border began in 1699 with the Treaty of Karlowitz, transferring Slavonia and a portion of Syrmia from the Ottoman Empire to the Habsburg monarchy at the conclusion of the Great Turkish War. The rest of Syrmia was transferred to the Habsburg monarchy through the Treaty of Passarowitz in 1718. The transferred territories were organised within the monarchy into the Kingdom of Slavonia, with its eastern border established at the Danube, and the defensive belt of Military Frontier stretching along the Sava River, governed directly from Vienna.

Subsequent territorial changes in the region included the proclamation of the short-lived Serbian Vojvodina during the Hungarian Revolution of 1848, which included Syrmia as its territory. A year later Serbian Vojvodina was abolished and replaced by the crown land of the Voivodeship of Serbia and Temes Banat, which ceded Syrmia back to the Kingdom of Slavonia. In 1868, following the Croatian–Hungarian Settlement, the Kingdom of Slavonia was incorporated into the Kingdom of Croatia-Slavonia, before the Slavonian Military Frontier was fully annexed to Croatia-Slavonia in 1881. At the end of World War I in 1918, Croatia-Slavonia became a part of the State of Slovenes, Croats and Serbs, while Banat, Bačka and Baranja proclaimed direct unification to Kingdom of Serbia on 25 November 1918. They were formed after the division of Hungarian Baranya and Bács-Bodrog Counties along the "Clemenceau line" established through the Treaty of Trianon of 1920. The territory of southern Baranja was ceded to the Kingdom of Serbs, Croats and Slovenes on the premise, claimed by the Yugoslav delegation at the conference, that it formed a natural hinterland of the city of Osijek. The territory south of the "Clemenceau line" was distributed to administrative divisions in existence before First World War, with the territory being reorganised administratively later in 1922. All this territories united under Kingdom of Serbs, Croats and Slovenes, which was renamed Yugoslavia in 1929.

Interwar period

Yugoslavia was established in 1918 as a centralised monarchy under Serbian Karađorđević dynasty. In 1922, the territory was reorganised by oblasts. Baranja along Bačka was incorporated into Novi Sad oblast, Syrmium with its seat in Vukovar became a separate oblast, while Osijek became incorporated into Slavonija oblast. By Royal Proclamation of 6 January 1929, the Constitution of 1921 was abolished, the parliament dissolved, and an absolutist monarchy proclaimed. The country was renamed the Kingdom of Yugoslavia and the territory was reorganised into banovinas. The greatest change in regard to the region in dispute here, occurred in Syrmia, with the districts of Vukovar, Vinkovci, Šid, Županja and Sremska Mitrovica becoming part of the Drinska Banovina with its seat in Tuzla. While the northern half of the disputed territory being incorporated along all of Baranja and Bačka into Danube Banovina. Two years later, in 1931, the districts of Vukovar, Vinkovci and Županja were transferred to Savska Banovina. A further territorial reorganisation was carried in 1939 as part of an agreement reached after intensive talks between authorities in Belgrade and opposition forces in Zagreb. The agreement known as Cvetković-Maček Agreement created the Banovina of Croatia. The creation of the Banovina of Croatia was the first step towards the federalization of Yugoslavia, in which a Slovenian autonomous unit was also envisaged, while the rest of the country was to be a Serbian unit. In relation to the Croat-Serbs boundary, the 1939 delimitation of Banovina of Croatia included Šid and Ilok districts while no version of the agreement included Baranja in Croatia, meaning the northern half of the disputed area was to stay excluded from Croatia in all versions.

After 1945

The first general outline of the post-1945 borders of Croatia was made by the Anti-Fascist Council for the National Liberation of Yugoslavia on 24 February 1945. Some issues regarding the border, such as Baranja, were left unresolved. The newly established Autonomous Province of Vojvodina, a part of the Socialist Republic of Serbia since April 1945, sought to establish its border with the Socialist Republic of Croatia along the Drava River, thus including Baranja, the Danube and along the Vukovar–Županja line. To counter the claims made by Vojvodina, Croatian authorities staked counterclaims in the areas of Vukovar, Vinkovci, Baranja and in the area of Sombor.

In order to settle the matter, the federal authorities set up a five-member commission presided over by Milovan Đilas in June 1945. The commission identified three sets of disputed territories. Those were the districts of Subotica, Sombor, Apatin and Odžaci in Bačka, districts of Batina and Darda in Baranja, and districts of Vukovar, Šid and Ilok in Syrmia. The districts in Bačka were awarded to Vojvodina, while those in Baranja were awarded to Croatia, both primarily along ethnic lines. The commission also noted that if Yugoslavia managed to acquire the region of Baja from Hungary, the decision regarding Bačka would be reviewed. The district of Vukovar was also awarded to Croatia, while Ilok and Šid were assigned to Vojvodina. In the case of Ilok, the decision was specified to be provisional until authorities are consolidated on either side of the boundary, when the issue would be reexamined.

Subsequently, the Serbian Parliament enacted a law establishing Vojvodina's borders. It referred to the boundary proposed by the Đilas commission explicitly noting that it was temporary. The law noted that the border follows the Danube from the Hungarian border to Ilok, crosses the Danube leaving Ilok, Šarengrad and Mohovo in Croatia then moves south and leaves the cadastral municipalities of Opatovac, Lovas, Tovarnik, Podgrađe, Apševci, Lipovac, Strošinci and Jamena in Croatia, and everything east of the line in Vojvodina. The awarding of Ilok to Croatia was a departure from the findings of Đilas commission and it was based on a referendum held in the town on the matter in 1945 or 1946, when its population voted to be added to Croatia.

Start of the dispute
In 1947, Vojvodina's Ministry of Agriculture complained to Serbia's Ministry of Forestry that the authorities in Vukovar refused to hand over four river islands, and then to Croatia's Ministry of Forestry regarding the same matter, asking for assistance. After Croatia refused the request, the Serbian authorities turned to the federal government. The federal authorities advised resolving the matter through mutual agreement and said that Vojvodina's interpretation of the law on its borders—that the border runs along the thalweg of the Danube valley, i.e. along the river's midpoint—is erroneous because the law does not apply such wording. In a letter dated 18 April 1947, Yugoslav authorities said that the disputed river islands were the territory of Vukovar district and that the territory could not be transferred to Vojvodina before the border was defined otherwise.

By May 1947, authorities in Vojvodina noted that there was a dispute between them and the authorities in Croatia regarding the interpretation of the position of the border along the Danube, and that the federal authorities, who were asked to mediate in the dispute, supported the position of Croatia. At the same time, Vojvodina requested that Croatia return the territories on the right bank of the Danube that had previously been ceded to it (Varoš-Viza and Mala Siga). While in the Yugoslav framework, the issue received little further attention as its resolution was discouraged by the federal authorities, and because the area involved had limited economic value, was uninhabited and frequently flooded.

By 1948, Croatia and Serbia agreed on two modifications of the border—the village of Bapska was transferred to Croatia, while Jamena was turned over to Vojvodina. No further changes to the border were agreed upon. A map of the area issued by the Yugoslav People's Army Military-Geographic Institute in 1967 depicts the border along the cadastre-based boundary, corresponding to the Croatian claim in the dispute.

See also
Croatia–Slovenia border disputes
List of territorial disputes

Footnotes

References
Books

Scientific journal articles

News reports

Other sources

 

Dispute
Territorial disputes of Croatia
Territorial disputes of Serbia
Border